This is a list of earthquakes in 2019. Only earthquakes of magnitude 6 or above are included, unless they result in damage and/or casualties, or are notable for other reasons. All dates are listed according to UTC time. Maximum intensities are indicated on the Modified Mercalli intensity scale and are sourced from United States Geological Survey (USGS) ShakeMap data. This year was not very active with only ten major quakes, and the death toll was the lowest since 2000. However, Albania experienced its strongest tremor in decades, and various deadly events struck Indonesia, Pakistan and the Philippines. The only 8+ quake occurred in Peru in May, but it did not cause much damage because of its great depth.

Compared to other years

An increase in detected earthquake numbers does not necessarily represent an increase in earthquakes per se. Population increase, habitation spread, and advances in earthquake detection technology all contribute to higher earthquake numbers being recorded over time.

By death toll

Listed are earthquakes with at least 10 dead.

By magnitude

Listed are earthquakes with at least 7.0 magnitude.

By month

January

February

March

April

May

June

July

August

September

October

November

December

See also
 
 Lists of earthquakes 
 Lists of 21st-century earthquakes 
 Lists of earthquakes by year

References

2019
2019
 
2019 natural disasters
2019-related lists